The 2003 Mid-Continent Conference men's basketball tournament was held March 9–11, 2003, at Kemper Arena in Kansas City, Missouri.

IUPUI defeated  in the title game, 66–64, to win their first Mid-Con/Summit League championship. The Jaguars earned an automatic bid to the 2003 NCAA tournament as the #16 seed in the Midwest region.

Format
All eight conference members qualified for the tournament. First round seedings were based on regular season record.

Bracket

References

2002–03 Mid-Continent Conference men's basketball season
Summit League men's basketball tournament